Hydrotarsus compunctus is a species of beetle in family Dytiscidae. It is endemic to Canary Islands.

References

Insects of the Canary Islands
Dytiscidae
Endemic fauna of the Canary Islands
Beetles described in 1865
Taxonomy articles created by Polbot